The Mistress of the Governor (German: Die Geliebte des Gouverneurs) is a 1927 German silent historical drama film directed by Friedrich Feher and starring Magda Sonja, Fritz Kortner and Otto Wallburg. It was shot at the Staaken Studios in Berlin. The film's art direction was by Max Knaake.

Cast
 Magda Sonja as Die Hofdame / Kammerfrau  
 Fritz Kortner as Zarewitsch Alexander / Gouverneurs Sohn  
 Otto Wallburg as Der Zar  
 Alexander Murski as Ministerpräsident  
 Robert Garrison as Variétébesitzer  
 Aribert Wäscher 
 Eberhard Leithoff as Abgeordneter der Bauernpartei  
 Hedwig Wangel as Die Zarin / Gouverneurs Gattin  
 Wolfgang Zilzer as Husarenoffizier  
 Werner Pittschau as Adjutant des Zarewitsch / Adjutant des Sohnes  
 Heinrich Witte as Adjutants Sekretär  
 Paul Rehkopf 
 Esther Korten as Variétébesitzers Sekretärin  
 Julius Brandt as Hofarzt  
 Elza Temary as Abgeordneters Frau

References

Bibliography
 Bock, Hans-Michael & Bergfelder, Tim. The Concise CineGraph. Encyclopedia of German Cinema. Berghahn Books, 2009.

External links

1927 films
Films of the Weimar Republic
Films directed by Friedrich Feher
German silent feature films
National Film films
German black-and-white films
Films shot at Staaken Studios
1927 drama films
German drama films
1920s historical films
German historical films
1920s German films